Philippe Magnier was a French sculptor (1647–1715) in the service of the Sun King's court painter Charles Le Brun.

Life
He was born in Paris to Laurent Magnier.  He worked for Le Brun at a time when many works of art were required for the new, enormous Versailles castle complex. He died in Paris.

Works
Les Lutteurs ('the Wrestlers'), a 1684–1685 copy of the classical Uffizi wrestlers, made for Versailles park (now in the Louvre museum)
L'Aurore 'Dawn' (Louvre)
Saint Jude (Louvre)
Nymphe (park of Versailles castle)
L'aurore (park of Versailles)
Le Printemps 'Spring' (park of Versailles)
Ulysse 'Ulysses' (park of Versailles)

References

External links
 

1647 births
1715 deaths
17th-century French sculptors
French male sculptors
18th-century French sculptors
Artists from Paris
18th-century French male artists